Murdock is an unincorporated community in Kingman County, Kansas, United States. As of the 2020 census, the population of the community and nearby areas was 37.

History
The post office in Murdock was established in 1884, but it was called New Murdock until 1910.

Murdock has a post office with ZIP code 67111.

Demographics

For statistical purposes, the United States Census Bureau has defined this community as a census-designated place (CDP).

Education
The community is served by Kingman–Norwich USD 331 public school district.

Notable people
 Alvin Dewey (1912-1987), special agent of the Kansas Bureau of Investigation

References

Further reading

External links
 Mennonite Camp Mennoscah
 Kingman County maps: Current, Historic, KDOT

Unincorporated communities in Kingman County, Kansas
Unincorporated communities in Kansas
1884 establishments in Kansas
Populated places established in 1884